The Women's 100 metres hurdles event at the 2013 European Athletics U23 Championships was held in Tampere, Finland, at Ratina Stadium on 13 July.

Medalists

Results

Final
13 July 2013 / 20:50
Wind: -0.1 m/s

Heats
Qualified: First 3 in each heat (Q) and 2 best performers (q) advance to the Final

Summary

Details

Heat 1
13 July 2013 / 19:10
Wind: +0.3 m/s

Heat 2
13 July 2013 / 19:18
Wind: +0.1 m/s

Participation
According to an unofficial count, 16 athletes from 13 countries participated in the event.

References

100 metres hurdles
Sprint hurdles at the European Athletics U23 Championships